FDTC may refer to:

 DTDP-3-amino-3,6-dideoxy-alpha-D-galactopyranose 3-N-acetyltransferase, an enzyme
 Florence–Darlington Technical College